The Nadikudi–Srikalahasti section is an ongoing railway section project of the Indian Railways. The section falls under the administration of Guntur of South Central Railway Zone. This serves as alternative route to Delhi–Chennai and Howrah–Chennai routes.

The project 

The project was sanctioned in the year 2010–11.

Phase-1 
Nadikudi (Guntur–Hyderabad route) to Savalyapuram (Guntur–Guntakal route) track, trial run completed. Electrification proposals for the completed route are sent to Higher authorities. By the end of 2018, this new route will be added to Guntur–Guntakal route.
DRM Guntur says that project deadline is 2022. At Rapur railway station (junction) both Nadikudi–Srikalahasti and Krishnapatnam–Obulavaripalle railway line cross each other.

Proposed list of stations 
It starts from Nadikudi railway Junction in Secunderabad–Guntur lane and passes through Piduguralla and from there new line starts with Nakarikallu, Rompicherla and connects with Guntur–Gunthakal section at Savalyapuram and passes through Vinukonda and again enters new line from Gundlakamma which passes through Darsi, Podili, Kanigiri, Pamuru, Vinjamuru, Dubagunta, Atmakuru, Obulayapalle, Rapuru and finally connects Venkatagiri at Gudur–Renigunta section.

References

Rail transport in Telangana
Guntur railway division
Vijayawada railway division
5 ft 6 in gauge railways in India
Proposed railway lines in India
Proposed infrastructure in Andhra Pradesh